The Río Banano Formation is a geologic formation in Costa Rica of the Limón Group. It preserves fossils dating back to the Middle Miocene to Piacenzian period.

Fossil content 
 Aphera bananensis
 Isopisthus acer
 Pacuarescarus

See also 
 List of fossiliferous stratigraphic units in Costa Rica

References

Bibliography 
 
 
  

Geologic formations of Costa Rica
Neogene Costa Rica
Sandstone formations
Siltstone formations
Shale formations
Deltaic deposits
Shallow marine deposits
Formations